Okyay Küçükkayalar (born 8 July 1978) is a Turkish archer. He competed in the men's individual event at the 1996 Summer Olympics.

References

1978 births
Living people
Turkish male archers
Olympic archers of Turkey
Archers at the 1996 Summer Olympics
Place of birth missing (living people)
20th-century Turkish people